4-Vinylcyclohexene is an organic compound consisting of a vinyl group attached to the 4-position of the cyclohexene ring.  It is a colorless liquid. Although chiral, it is used mainly as the racemate. It is a precursor to vinylcyclohexene dioxide.

Production
It is produced by buta-1,3-diene dimerization in a Diels-Alder reaction. The reaction is conducted at 110 - 425 °C at pressures of 1.3 - 100 MPa in the presence of a catalyst. A mixture of silicon carbide and salts of copper or chromium comprises the catalyst. A competing product is 1,5-cyclooctadiene.

Safety
4-Vinylcyclohexene is classified as a Group 2B carcinogen by the IARC ("possibly carcinogenic to humans").

References

Cyclohexenes
IARC Group 2B carcinogens
Vinyl compounds